The 2011–12 West Bank Premier League started on 2 September 2011 and concluded on 21 April 2012. Hilal Al-Quds won their first title.

Final standings

References

West Bank Premier League seasons
1
West